This is a list of England international footballers who were born outside England. For the purposes of international football the football world governing body, FIFA, considers England, Scotland, Wales and Northern Ireland to be distinct and individual countries. Players born in countries other than England may qualify for the England team through English parents or grandparents, or through residency in England and subsequent naturalisation as British citizens. The Crown dependencies, which for footballing purposes come under the purview of the Football Association of England, have provided two players to the England football team.

Players are listed below by birthplace and played for the full England team.

Australia
Tony Dorigo
Arthur Savage (Identity disputed)

Belgium
 William Bryant

Canada
Owen Hargreaves
Edward Hagarty Parry
Fikayo Tomori

France

French Guiana
Cyrille Regis

Guernsey
Matt Le Tissier

India

British India
Claude Ashton
Alfred Goodwyn
Elphinstone Jackson
William Kenyon-Slaney
William Lindsay
Stuart Macrae
James F. M. Prinsep
Alf Quantrill

Ivory Coast
Marc Guéhi
Wilfried Zaha (later played for Ivory Coast)

Jamaica
Luther Blissett
John Barnes
Raheem Sterling

Jersey
Graeme Le Saux

Mauritius
Herbert Rawson

Mexico
Richard Geaves

Nigeria
John Salako

Scotland
John Bain

Sierra Leone
Nathaniel Chalobah

Singapore
Terry Butcher
Basil Patchitt

South Africa
Gordon Hodgson
Frank Osborne
Reg Osborne
Bill Perry
William Rawson
Brian Stein
Colin Viljoen

Sri Lanka

British Ceylon
Charles Eastlake Smith

Wales
Frederick Green
Rob Jones

See also
Australia players born in England
Republic of Ireland players born in England
Scotland players born in England
United States players born in England
Wales players born in England

References

England
born
Association football player non-biographical articles
English diaspora
Immigration to the United Kingdom
England